Scandal is a 1986 novel by the Japanese author Shūsaku Endō. Endō was a Japanese Catholic writer whose works, among other things, covered various aspects of the Japanese Catholic experience. He was furthermore a member of the Japanese literary establishment, accounting for the importance of PEN meetings in the work. Aging in Japan was also addressed via commentary on the medical problems suffered by an elderly man.

Plot summary
Set in Tokyo during the 1980s, it tells the story of an old Catholic writer struggling with old age and the feeling that he yet has to write his magnum opus. One day, a young woman shows up at a party attended by the main character, Suguro, mentioning loudly that he has not been visiting the ill-reputed street where she works as an artist lately. Because of his reputation as a Christian writer with high moral standards, such behaviour is seen by his publishers as very undesirable and by himself as very embarrassing.

He meets a young girl, Mitsu, telling him about enjo kōsai ("compensated dating"), and Suguro decides to hire her as an assistant to help relieve his rheumatic wife from such activities. As time passes he starts to dream about this young girl, but keeps silent about it so as not to worry his wife.

Reluctantly, Suguro visits the studio of the woman from the party, where he meets an older woman whom he later befriends. He also starts to discover another world, including masochism and various more or less odd forms of prostitution. The people in that world all seem to know him and Suguro suspects that an impostor is out there, trying to destroy his reputation, and starts to hunt for this man.

Eventually the older woman, with whom he now has become rather close, sends him a letter inviting him to a love hotel where, she writes, the identity of the impostor will be revealed. Suguro finds the young Mitsu there, drunk and half-naked on the bed. Here, in the end of the book, it is revealed to him that a dark side exists below his polished surface.

1986 novels
Novels by Shusaku Endo
Novels set in Tokyo